Lomin is a village and municipality in the Astara Rayon of Azerbaijan. It has a population of 549.  The municipality consists of the villages of Lomin and Vovlada.

References

Populated places in Astara District